Arenga is a genus of palms, native to Southeast Asia, southern China, New Guinea, and northern Australia. They are small to medium-sized palms, growing to 2–20 m tall, with pinnate leaves 2–12 m long. Arenga palms can grow in areas with little sunlight and relatively infertile soil.

Species
 Arenga australasica (H.Wendl. & Drude) S.T.Blake ex H.E.Moore – Queensland
 Arenga brevipes Becc. – Sumatra, Borneo
 Arenga caudata  (Lour.) H.E.Moore – Guangxi, Hainan, Indochina
 Arenga distincta Mogea – Borneo
 Arenga engleri Becc. – Taiwan
 Arenga hastata  (Becc.) Whitmore – Thailand, Malaysia, Borneo, Sumatra
 Arenga hookeriana (Becc.) Whitmore – Thailand, Malaysia
 Arenga listeri Becc. – Christmas Island
 Arenga longicarpa C.F.Wei – Guangdong
 Arenga longipes Mogea – Sumatra
 Arenga micrantha  C.F.Wei – Tibet, Bhutan, Arunachal Pradesh
 Arenga microcarpa Becc. in K.M.Schumann & U.M.Hollrung – Maluku, New Guinea, Northern Territory of Australia
 Arenga mindorensis Becc. – Mindoro
 Arenga obtusifolia Mart.- Thailand, Malaysia, Borneo, Java
 Arenga pinnata  (Wurmb) Merr. – Assam, Indochina, Philippines, Sulawesi; naturalized in southern China, Benin, Maluku, New Guinea, Hawaii
 Arenga plicata Mogea – Sumatra
 Arenga porphyrocarpa (Blume ex Mart.) H.E.Moore – Java, Sumatra
 Arenga retroflorescens  H.E.Moore & Meijer – Sabah
 Arenga ryukyuensis A.J.Hend – Ryukyu Islands
 Arenga talamauensis Mogea – Sumatra
 Arenga tremula  (Blanco) Becc. – Philippines
 Arenga undulatifolia Becc. – Borneo, Palawan, Sulawesi
 Arenga westerhoutii Griff. – southern China, Indochina, Assam, Arunachal Pradesh, Bhutan
 Arenga wightii Griff. – India

References

 
Flora of Indomalesia
Arecaceae genera